"Old Man in New World" is a short story by British writer Olaf Stapledon, published as a separate volume by George Allen and Unwin in 1944. It was published through PEN, the international writers' association.

The story is set in the late 1990s, and tells of the world that has been rebuilt from the devastation of the Second World War, as seen through the eyes of an old revolutionary. The "Old Man" is invited to London to see "The Procession of The Peoples", an event celebrating the new order and the triumph of the human spirit.

In witnessing this event, however, the Old Man sees the seeds of the very things he, in his youth, fought against — falsehood, political will and religiosity.

External links 

1944 short stories
Science fiction short stories
Works by Olaf Stapledon
Allen & Unwin books
1944 books
Fiction set in the 1990s